Gary Riddell (9 August 1966 – 11 June 1989) was a Scottish professional footballer who played as a central defender.

Career
Born in Ellon, Riddell played for Aberdeen and Dunfermline Athletic.

He died while on a charity half-marathon raising money for the Hillsborough disaster.

References

1966 births
1989 deaths
Scottish footballers
Aberdeen F.C. players
Dunfermline Athletic F.C. players
Scottish Football League players
Association football central defenders
People from Ellon, Aberdeenshire
Footballers from Aberdeenshire